The 2015 UNAF U-23 Tournament is an association football tournament open to the Under-23 national teams of UNAF member countries. The tournament was originally planned from 8 to 16 January 2015 in the Stade Ahmed Zabana in Oran, Algeria. However it was postponed to a later date after the withdrawal of Egypt, Libya and Morocco.

Participants

 (hosts)

Venues

References

External links

2015
2015 in African football
2015
2014–15 in Moroccan football
2014–15 in Egyptian football
2014–15 in Algerian football
2014–15 in Libyan football
2014–15 in Tunisian football